The SD80MAC was a  C-C diesel-electric locomotive. It was powered by a 20-cylinder version of EMD's 710G prime mover, and was the second diesel locomotive by GM-EMD to use a v20 engine, since EMD's SD45 and SD45-2. It introduced a wide radiator housing similar to GE Transportation locomotives and the placement of dynamic brakes at the rear of the locomotive, which is a quieter location, features that were incorporated into the SD90MAC and SD70ACe models. Key spotting differences between the SD80MAC and SD90MAC include no external rear sandbox on the SD90MAC, rear number boards, and the placement of the front numberboards (above the cab windows on the SD80MAC, on the nose on most SD90MACs). The SD80MAC also had recessed red marker lights in the nose, an identifying feature unique to Conrail (CR) locomotives, although Norfolk Southern (NS) had removed the lights on most of their former Conrail engines.

All 30 SD80MAC units built were delivered to Conrail, and the 28 production units were completed, tested, and painted at the former Pennsylvania Railroad shops in Altoona, Pennsylvania.
 
Prior to the 1995 merger with Union Pacific, Chicago and North Western Railway placed an order of 15 locomotives. Canadian Pacific placed an order as well but it was changed to SD90MACs. Conrail planned a second order of SD80MACs, but its new owners changed the order to SD70s and SD70MACs, all of which would be built at the Juniata Shops in Altoona.

Vale Mining of Brazil ordered a set of 7 updated locomotives designated as the SD80ACe model. These locomotives feature Tier 1 compliant 20-710G3C-ES engines, with 5,300 HP (3.9MW) @ 950 RPM. The design is currently for export only, and these specific locomotives will run on Vale Mining's  broad gauge trackage.

Another broad gauge variant also came in 2012 only, that is, the EMD GT50AC, also known as the Indian locomotive class WDG-5, a smaller and lighter 135-ton variant, with an up-tweaked EMD 20N-710G3B-EC engine, capable of producing 5,500 HP (4.1MW) @ 910 RPM, to serve the Indian Railways, whose current tracks are weak to handle very heavy locomotives, just like how EMD GT46MAC WDG-4 was developed from SD70MAC by Reducing the weight. This locomotive has been developed indigenously by Banaras Locomotive Works (BLW) of India

After the split of Conrail, the SD80MACs were split up between the Norfolk Southern Railway and CSX Transportation. Norfolk Southern received 17 units (numbered 7200–7216) while CSX got 13 (800–812, being renumbered to 4590–4602). The former Conrail units were the first AC traction locomotives owned by Norfolk Southern, with the railroad not ordering more until late 2008 with an order of General Electric's ES44AC. In late 2014, Norfolk Southern announced that they had reached an agreement with CSX Transportation to trade 12 EMD SD40-2 units (NS 3425–3447) for CSX's remaining 12 SD80MACs, leaving NS as the model's sole operator. They were delivered to the NS in April 2015.

In February 2020, following the beginning of COVID-19 Pandemic, Norfolk Southern retired all 29 of its remaining SD80MACs, owing to their operational costs. Six units  were sold to Canadian Pacific Railway as parts sources for their recent EMD SD70ACU rebuilds. The remainder of the NS fleet went to Progress Rail and were scrapped. The Conrail Historical Society is currently in contact with Canadian Pacific to hopefully set one SD80MAC aside for preservation, after failing to make an agreement with Progress Rail.

Ex-CSX 4594, formerly CSX 804, and built as CR 4110, was scrapped in January 2014 after being used as a parts donor following a derailment in early 2009.

On Friday November 18, 2016, a NS South Fork crew was securing their engines for the night, when an electrical fire broke out in the cab of NS 7210, ex CR 4118. There were no injuries, but the cab interior was completely destroyed. The unit was towed to the Juniata Shops in Altoona where it was buried in a deadline, Said never to run again. The 7210 was among the units sold to Progress Rail and scrapped in December 2021 or January 2022.

SD80MAC technical details 
The technical details of this locomotive model are as follows:

Prime mover
Electro-Motive Diesel V-20 710G3B-ES
Displacement: 
Idle: 200 rpm
Full speed: 904 rpm
Lube oil capacity: 
Cooling water capacity: 
Fuel capacity: 

Main alternator
Electro-Motive Diesel TA22-CA8A
Maximum voltage: 2600 V DC
Maximum current: 8100 A

Traction motors
6 Siemens 1TB2830 AC motors mounted 3 each on 2 HTCR-2 Radial Self Steering trucks.
Rated output: 
Gearing: 83:16
Wheel size: 
Max revolutions: 3,435 rpm
Starting torque: 
Continuous torque: 
Maximum voltage: 2,183 V

Performance
Maximum speed: 
Starting tractive effort: 
Continuous tractive effort: 
Braking effort)
Weight:)

References 
 
 

SD80MAC
C-C locomotives
Diesel-electric locomotives of the United States
Freight locomotives
Conrail
Conrail locomotives
Standard gauge locomotives of the United States
Railway locomotives introduced in 1995
SD80MAC